Adolf Benca (born 16 May 1959, in Bratislava, Czechoslovakia), is an American painter of Slovakian origin.

Early life and beginnings 
Benca was born on 16 May 1959, in Bratislava, Czechoslovakia. He was the older of two children, the younger being his sister Lubica. His family immigrated to the United States when he was ten years old, in 1969. From 1969 to 1973 he attended the Elementary Private School in Chicago. He attended Grayslake High School in Illinois between 1973 and 1977.

He became interested in art very early in his life, attending several art schools in Chicago while he was an elementary student.

In 1966, while he was still living in Czechoslovakia, he was already illustrating children's books. In 1968, a year prior to his family emigrating from Czechoslovakia, because of Russian occupation of Bratislava, his family moved to Vienna, where young Benca became interested in philosophy and started painting mythological themes and subjects. He participated in a few young artist programs in 1970 and 1975.

Studies 
Adolf Benca studied and graduated from several universities. From 1977 to 1981 he studied at The Cooper Union for the Advancement of Science and Art, art school in New York, where he received his B.F.A. (Bachelor of Fine Arts) degree. For the next four years (1982–1985) he studied at the Columbia University College of Physicians and Surgeons, graduating at 1987, receiving the title of Master of Fine Arts (M.F.A.). From 1987 to 1988 he studied the human anatomy at the University of Bologna in Italy where he received the title "Doctor honoris causa" (Dr.h.c.) in the area of anatomy. At University Johns Hopkins in Baltimore, Maryland he received the title "Doctor honoris causa" in the area of philosophy.

Career 
As he was receiving his titles and studied, Benca continued to paint and exhibit his works in many galleries around the world, many of his paintings ending up in private collections.

In 1985 he became a member of the Swizzero di Roma.

In 1987 he became a member of the French Academy in Rome.

In 1988 he became a member of the American Academy in Rome.

In 1994 he became a member of the Swedish Institute in Rome.

In 2000 he became a member of the Academy of Arts in Berlin.

After "the Fall of the Iron Curtain" he decided to continue his career in Central and Eastern Europe.

In 2002 he started his work in Prague, and was awarded the award of the "Masaryk Academy".

On the barges under "Floating Galleries" he is exhibiting most of his artwork created from 2000 to 2013.

In 2012 Adolf Benca and the "Bratislava's ship company" a.d. (Bratislavská lodná spoločnosť a. s ) have founded the company "Adolf Benca Académia s.r.o.".

In 2013 this project was internationally accepted at "Brussels Symposium" EBU (European Barge Union).

The partner in realization of this international project is the "European Fine Art Fair".

His works can be found all over the world, in private collections, as well as exhibits at museums, such as "Metropolitan Museum" and "Museum of Modern Art" in New York.

World art institutions exhibiting the artwork of Adolf Benca

Standalone exhibitions

Group exhibitions

Works 
In his repertoire of works, some of the most notable ones are:
 “Rabbinic dispute“ – 120 × 200 cm, technique: oil and acrylic on canvas, created in 2012. It is currently located in the Floating galleries.
 “Nurse“ – 180 × 180 cm, technique: acrylic on canvas created in 2004. Currently located in the Floating galleries.
 “Spanish influenza" – 196 × 281 cm, technique: acrylic on canvas, created in 2003. In the Floating gallery Tabor.
 “Dialogues of the Dead Series: Triptych 1, Triptych 2, Triptych 3“ –  300 × 400 cm (each of 3 parts),  technique: acrylic on carpet created in 2003. At Adolf Benca Academy Ltd.
 “Winner on the cross“ – 300 × 200 cm, technique: acrylic, an industrial paint and tar on the carpet, created in 2003. Located at the Floating galleries.
 “She” – 200 × 300 cm, technique: acrylic, an industrial paint and tar on the carpet, created in 2003. Located at the Floating galleries. 
 "The Way to the Northwest" – a collection of 16 paintings; various dimensions; painting technique: acrylic on wood. This collection was exhibited at the European Parliament in Brussels. In the private property of the collectors. 
 Limited edition "Stigma 54“ – contains 54 art works that characterize and represent „Stigma“ (seal) which in Ancient Rome and Ancient Greece was used to stigmatize slaves, criminals, prostitutes, traitors and mentally ill people. The works have various dimensions: height 11,81 – 17,72 inches x width 17,72 – 25,59 inches; painting technique: acrylic on wood, 2012. Owned by various members of the Alliance  of Adolf Benca Academy. These art works could afford only the privileged collectors all over the world. 
The artworks that have been exhibited in the European Parliament since the first of July 2016 regarding the chairmanship of the Slovak Republic in European Union:
 “€=mc2” (Portrait of Otto von Habsburg) – 175 × 141 cm, oil on canvas,  created in 2011. As of July 2016 located at the European Union Parliament. 
 “Waterways – Northwest Passage, No.1” – 57 × 149 cm, oil on canvas, created in 2012. As of July 2016 located at the European Union Parliament.
 “Waterways – Northwest Passage, No.7” – 55 × 112 cm, oil on canvas, created in 2009. As of July 2016 located at the European Union Parliament.
 “Waterways – Northwest Passage, No.13” – 50 × 140 cm, oil on canvas, created in 2012. As of July 2016 located at the European Union Parliament. 
 “Waterways – Northwest Passage, No.14” – 82 × 102 cm, oil on canvas, created in 2012. As of July 2016 located at the European Union Parliament.

External links 
 
MoMA Public Collection
Benca at modern-art-masters

References 

Schröter, Klaus, Adolf Benca, New York: Twining Gallery, cop. 1985, Retrieved 29 June 2016
https://web.archive.org/web/20160815154050/http://benca-museum.com/adolf-benca/ Retrieved 29 June 2016
https://web.archive.org/web/20160815165106/http://benca-museum.com/adolf-benca-academia/ Retrieved 29 June 2016
 Retrieved 29 June 2016
Barbara Sullivan, How this man... Changed this man's life, Chicago: Chicago Tribune, can be found here: http://articles.chicagotribune.com/1987-03-29/news/8701240466_1_paintings-walls-apartment Retrieved 29 June 2016
https://web.archive.org/web/20160822195003/http://wwwopac.upm.cz/zaznam.php?detail_num=1438&vers=&lang=eng&user_hash=7d6313c0bccc140d577e0696633152806ab7dc6c&ascdesc=0&sortby=&strana=0 Retrieved 29 June 2016
http://www.idref.fr/031606113 Retrieved 29 June 2016
http://bombmagazine.org/article/89/skellital-sea Retrieved 29 June 2016
http://www.slideshare.net/DrHcAdolfvonBenzCado/adolf-resume-50897746 Retrieved 29 June 2016
https://web.archive.org/web/20160814232157/http://www.mkic.sk/zvesti/zvesti2-2002.pdf Retrieved 29 June 2016
https://web.archive.org/web/20160817085026/http://www.artfinding.com/6951/Biography/Benca-Adolph Retrieved 29 June 2016

Living people
1959 births
American painters